Nereistoxin is a natural product identified in 1962 as the toxic organic compound N,N-dimethyl-1,2-dithiolan-4-amine. It had first been isolated in 1934 from the marine annelid Lumbriconereis heteropoda and acts by blocking the nicotinic acetylcholine receptor. Researchers at Takeda in Japan investigated it as a possible insecticide. They subsequently developed a number of derivatives that were commercialised, including those with the ISO common names  bensultap, cartap, thiocyclam and thiosultap.

Structures and synthesis

Bensultap (R=SO2Ph) was made by the reaction of the sodium salt of benzenethiolsulfonate (PhSO2SNa) with N,N-dimethyl 1,3-dichloro-2-propylamine or N,N-dimethyl 2,3-dichloropropylamine in ethanol.

Bensultap can be converted to nereistoxin by treatment with alkali.

History
Japanese fishermen used the annelid worm Lumbriconereis heteropoda Marenz as bait and after accidental poisonings the chemical agent responsible was identified and named nereistoxin. In the 1960s, researchers at Takeda Chemical Industries synthesised the active material N,N-dimethyl-1,2-dithiolan-4-amine and derivatives in which the sulfur-sulfur bond of the dithiolane ring was replaced by alternative sulfur-linked groups. The resulting compounds were in many cases less toxic to mammals than the natural product while retaining good activity on insects. It was subsequently shown that all the compounds which were commercialised acted by being propesticides — breaking down in the environment to nereistoxin or its uncyclised dithiol.

Mechanism of action
Nereistoxin has chemical similarity to acetylcholine and its mode of action was suggested originally as being possibly by interference with acetylcholinesterase. Later electrophysiological studies using synapses from the cockroach Periplaneta americana showed that it acts by blocking the nicotinic acetylcholine receptor / ion channel complex in the insect central nervous system. This is also the mode of action of the related insecticides, all of which can produce the dithiol corresponding to cleavage of the 1,2-thiolane ring in the parent compound.

Usage
None of the insecticidal analogues of nereistoxin became major products in agriculture and their use was mainly limited to Japanese and Chinese cultivation of rice, where their control of pests such as the rice stem borer Chilo suppressalis was significant. They were not licensed for use in Europe or the USA. The limited success of this group of chemicals was partly due to other  compounds having similar modes of action but higher potency and mammalian safety becoming available.

References

Further reading

External links

Dithiolanes
Insecticides
Toxins